Lawrence station is a Caltrain commuter rail station in Sunnyvale, California. The station has four tracks with side platforms serving the outer tracks.

The original Lawrence station was built by the San Francisco and San Jose Railroad, which completed the first rail link between San Francisco and San Jose in 1864. By August 1866, "Lawrence's" station had appeared in the timetable. It was named for Alfred Chester Lawrence, who owned the land in the area at the time. The San Francisco and San Jose Railroad was acquired by Southern Pacific, which continued to operate a station at Lawrence until 1945. In 1982 or 1983, Caltrain reopened the station.

References

External links

Caltrain - Lawrence Station

Caltrain stations in Santa Clara County, California
Transportation in Sunnyvale, California
Former Southern Pacific Railroad stations in California